Ming Kipa (born 1988) is a Nepalese Sherpa woman who held the record as the youngest person to climb Mount Everest from 2003 to 2010. She reached the summit on May 22, 2003 when she was 15 years old, with her brother Mingma Gyula and her sister Lhakpa. Nepalese law does not allow climbers under 16 to climb Everest, so Ming Kipa Sherpa summitted Everest from the Chinese side. Her record was broken in 2010 when Jordan Romero reached the summit on May 22 of that year at the age of 13 years, 10 months. The previous record holder was Temba Tsheri who climbed Everest at the age of 16 in 2001.

At the time of this record, 2003, about 1200 people had reached the summit of Mount Everest since 1953 with about 175 dying.

See also
List of Mount Everest records
Dicky Dolma
Melissa Arnot
Shriya Shah-Klorfine

References

External links
The Guardian- Teenage girl conquers Everest, 50 years on - Luke Harding in New Delhi - Sunday 25 May 2003 06.58 EDT

1988 births
Living people
Nepalese mountain climbers
Sherpa summiters of Mount Everest
Nepalese Buddhists
Nepalese summiters of Mount Everest
Nepalese female mountain climbers